Red Square is a 1970 Soviet drama film directed by Vasili Ordynsky.

Plot 
The film consists of two series. The first series tells about the commissar Dmitry Amelin, who goes to the grenadier full to convince the soldiers to join the Red Army. In the second series Amelin becomes the commissioner of the division, led by Kutasov, who plans to organize an imitation of the blow of one unit, which will distract the White Guards.

Cast 
 Sergey Yakovlev as Lenin
 Aleksandr Kutepov as Yakov Sverdlov
 Vyacheslav Shalevich as Nikolay Kutasov
 Stanislav Lyubshin as Dmitry Amelin
 Valentina Malyavina as Natasha Kutasova
 Sergey Nikonenko as Volodya Koltsov
 Uno Loyt as Uno Parts
 Pavel Kormunin as machine gunner Karpushonok
 Viktor Shulgin as Kamyshov
 Alexander Kaidanovsky as Kashchei
 Nikolai Karachentsov as episode
 Aleksei Smirnov as Soldier of the 38th Grenadier Regiment

References

External links 
 

1970 films
1970s Russian-language films
Soviet drama films
1970 drama films
Russian Civil War films
Films about Vladimir Lenin
Mosfilm films